Bruno Everton Quadros, or simply Bruno Quadros (born February 3, 1977 in Rio de Janeiro, Brazil), is a Brazilian manager and former defender who currently works as the assistant head coach of Cerezo Osaka.

Club statistics

Honors
 FC Tokyo
 J.League Cup : 2009

References

External links

1977 births
Living people
Brazilian footballers
Brazilian football managers
Brazilian expatriate footballers
Expatriate footballers in Japan
Expatriate footballers in Turkey
Expatriate footballers in Cyprus
Campeonato Brasileiro Série A players
Süper Lig players
J1 League players
J2 League players
Cypriot First Division players
CR Flamengo footballers
Botafogo de Futebol e Regatas players
Galatasaray S.K. footballers
Sport Club do Recife players
Associação Desportiva São Caetano players
Guarani FC players
Cruzeiro Esporte Clube players
Cerezo Osaka players
Hokkaido Consadole Sapporo players
FC Tokyo players
Alki Larnaca FC players
Clube Atlético Linense players
Clube Atlético Linense managers
Duque de Caxias Futebol Clube managers
Marília Atlético Clube managers
Association football defenders
Footballers from Rio de Janeiro (city)